Blagorodovac   is a village in Croatia. It is connected by the D26 highway. The village has about 229 residents and is situated northwest of Gornji Uljanik.

References

Populated places in Bjelovar-Bilogora County